Periander is a 1731 tragedy by the British writer John Tracy. It is based on the life of Periander, the Ancient Greek ruler of Corinth.

The original cast included James Quin as Periander, Lacy Ryan as Procles, William Milward as Aristides, Thomas Chapman as Alcander, Thomas Walker as Hypsenor and John Ogden as Lycon.

References

Bibliography
 Burling, William J. A Checklist of New Plays and Entertainments on the London Stage, 1700-1737. Fairleigh Dickinson Univ Press, 1992.
 Nicoll, Allardyce. History of English Drama, 1660-1900, Volume 2. Cambridge University Press, 2009.

1731 plays
British plays
West End plays
Tragedy plays